Northern Moor is a tram stop for Phase 3b of the Manchester Metrolink. It opened on 3 November 2014. and is on the Airport Line on Sale Road.  The tram stop is on the Northern Moor / Sale Moor border.

Services
Trams run every 10 minutes between 06:00-19:00 north to Victoria and south to Manchester Airport. Between 19:00 and 23:59, a service operates between Deansgate-Castlefield and Manchester Airport every 20 minutes.

Ticket zones 
Northern Moor is located in Metrolink ticket zone 3.

Facilities 
The tram stop has two ticket machines, one on each platform. There are eight seats on the platform, a bike rack on the Airport direction platform, but no parking is available.

References

External links

 Metrolink stop information
 Northern Moor area map
 Light Rail Transit Association
 Airport route map

Tram stops in Manchester
Railway stations in Great Britain opened in 2014
2014 establishments in England